Catastia incorruscella is a species of snout moth in the genus Catastia. It was described by George Duryea Hulst in 1895. It is found in North America, including Colorado, Utah and California.

References

Moths described in 1895
Phycitini